Casa Verona (died 1680), or Cassa Verona, is the Anglicized name of Kasi Viranna, an Indian merchant who served as the Chief Merchant of the Agency of Madras. He founded Cassa Verona & Co., the first Indian-owned joint stock company.

Career 
The earliest East India Company records of Casa Verona go back to 1665–70, during the Agency of Sir Edward Winter when he is mentioned as a partner of Beri Timmanna. After Timmanna's death, Verona obtained a virtual monopoly over Madras trade. He was on extremely friendly terms with agents Winter and later Sir William Langhorne, 1st Baronet.

References 
 

1680 deaths
Year of birth missing